Javan Minan Kabul F.C. is a football team in Afghanistan. They play in Afghanistan's Premier Football League.

Current squad

References

Football clubs in Afghanistan
Sport in Kabul